Buko is a village and former municipality in the district of Wittenberg, Germany.

Buko may also refer to:

People
 Bukō Shimizu (1913–1995), a Japanese photographer
 David Buko, a Papua New Guinean rugby league player
 Andrzej Buko (born 1947), a Polish medieval archaeologist

Food
"Buko" is the Philippine English term for young green coconut
Buko juice, coconut water from young green coconuts in Philippine English
Buko pie, a traditional Filipino baked young-coconut custard pie
Buko salad, a Filipino salad desert made with young coconut and milk or cream and various other ingredients

Other
 BuKo (TV channel), Philippine TV channel
 Mount Bukō, a mountain in Japan
 Toda-ha Bukō-ryū, a Japanese koryū martial art
 BUKO Pharma-Kampagne, a watchdog for German pharmaceutical companies
 Buko (2022), a Czech film